Nieuwsuur (News Hour) is a Dutch current affairs television program produced for the NPO by the government broadcasters NOS and NTR. It is broadcast daily between 9.30 pm and 10 pm (9.30-10 pm at weekends) on NPO 2. The programme pays particular attention to Dutch and European politics, as well as other international events; in addition, there is a sports news bulletin in each broadcast.

History 
As early as 2008 there were plans for a new news programme, combining NOVA, the NOS Journaal and Den Haag Vandaag (The Hague Today). The plan for this programme was rejected by the NPO board of directors after complaints from other broadcasters, as was the cooperation between the membership-based broadcaster VARA and the public broadcasters NPS and NOS. This was because the NPO did not want a member-based broadcaster such as the traditionally left-leaning VARA to be involved in an objective and independent news programme.

The Algemeen Dagblad reported in November 2009 that the NOS wished to cease production of NOVA, as NOS management did not consider the programme to be objective or neutral enough. At the end of January 2010, it was announced that NOVA and current affairs programme Netwerk would end at the start of autumn 2010, and that Nieuwsuur would replace NOVA from 6 September 2010.

Presenters

Main presenters

News presenters

Sports presenters

References

External links 
 

Dutch television news shows
2010 Dutch television series debuts
2010s Dutch television series
NPO 2 original programming